Amir Hetsroni (born February 6, 1968) is an Israeli professor of communication, a novelist and publicist in Israel known for his extremely divisive views.

Biography

Amir Hetsroni was born on February 6, 1968, in Tel Aviv, the only child of Sima Kolker (1932–2011) and David Hetsroni (formerly Shtagovsky; 1933-2016). Upon finishing high school studies he was conscripted into the Israel Defense Forces for three years. He was initially deployed in Nablus and as a security guard at a military base in Tel Aviv before serving as a military correspondent for two years. He graduated with BA in Psychology and Cinema and Television from Tel Aviv University in 1993 and received an MA in 1996 and PhD in Communication from the Hebrew University of Jerusalem in 1999.
He worked as a senior lecturer at Max Stern Yezreel Valley College from 2000 to 2009 and then became a professor at Ariel University which fired him in 2014 following an article he wrote that supported the BDS movement and objected to the 2014 Israel-Gaza conflict. In May 2015, he left Israel for Denmark. After living in Copenhagen for a while, he moved to China and taught at Xi'an Jiaotong-Liverpool University in Suzhou for a year, then moved to Turkey and became a full-time associate professor at Koç University in Istanbul. Hetsroni published hundreds of op-ed articles expressing anti-Zionist views, one novel פיצוחים ("Family Feud" – Hebrew) about wallflower upbringing in the 1980s, and one graphic novel אבוד בסין ("Lost in China" – Hebrew) written in collaboration with Racheli Rottner and based on his turbulent partly open relationship with Shirin Noufi – an Israeli-Arab lawyer. Hetsroni is intentionally child free.

In May 2020, as part of Switzerland International Film Festival (SIFF) official competition, a feature-length documentary "Amir Hetsroni: Case Study" made by the Swiss-Israeli psychologist and film director Giuseppe (Yossi) Strenger was screened. The film was shot in late 2016, on the month following David Hetsroni's – Amir's father – death, and unfolds Amir's mourning process and his relationship with Shirin Noufi, his partner at the time. The film won the first place in the festival's "Best Documentary" category. Later on that year, "Amir Hetsroni: Case Study" was also selected for Out of The Can Film Festival in England, and for Austria International Film Festival, where it has won the prize for "Best Editing".

Academic work

Hetsroni wrote and edited four books and nearly 100 journal articles and book chapters. His main areas of research are sex, violence, and other objectionable content on television programs and commercials and their effect on our perception of daily life. He showed that in contrast with common wisdom, inpatients in medical drama are more likely to die than in real hospitals and that religious viewers tend to be less afraid of crime and terror as they watch more television than are non-religious viewers. In the main, Hetsroni aligns with the cultivation school which suggests that routine viewing of television unconsciously influences the viewers to see the world through TV eyes, but he often adopts a more limited effect paradigm than the theory proponents George Gerbner and Larry Gross. Hetsroni's most original contribution to the scientific literature is the conception of pluralistic media ignorance according to which the more saturated the home screen is with objectionable content, the more likely viewers are to over-estimate the content's actual prevalence because of the difficulty in accurately quantifying it as it applies to reality. He was associate editor of Communication Research Reports and Corporate Communications and is listed among the 100 most prolific authors in advertising scholarship in a study published in 2008 in Journal of Advertising.

Political opinions and ideological debates
Ever since the early 2010s, Hetsroni's name has been associated with various scandals where he expressed a divisive outlook. He describes himself as an "anti-Zionist who is not pro-Arabic". 

Hetsroni has made comments in favor of colonialism and against the absorption of refugees. 

In 2011, when a socialist protester set himself alight at a demonstration, Hetsroni commented that this was "an inexpensive way to get rid of a social parasite". 

In 2013, he described feminist women marching in the SlutWalk as "too bulky to be looked at" and said that if he needed to choose between rescuing a feminist and rescuing a cat, he would rescue the cat as cats are more grateful than are feminists. He sued for slander a feminist activist who called him "misogynist consumer of prostitution" and won. 

In 2014, he described the Israeli war in Gaza as a massacre, and in 2015 he blamed Mizrahi Jews in the victory of the right wing in the parliamentary elections, adding that these Jews should have stayed in their homeland. This brought about public outcry and demands to interrogate Hetsroni for spreading racism and hate speech. Further demands came in 2016, when Hetsroni desecrated the national flag by posting a picture in which he uses the flag to mop the floor at his house and in 2017 when he posted a picture of himself smiling on the graves of soldiers saying that they were "idiots who did not know how to avoid the draft". 

Israel's attorney general dismissed all the claims to put Hetsroni on trial, stipulating that his words fall within the perimeter of free speech. In 2018, Rabbi Meir Mazuz called Hetsroni an "incarnation of the devil". Hetsroni himself announced that he is "no longer Jewish".

Books

Ellis, L., Hershberger, S., Field, E., Wersinger, S., Pellis, S., Geary, D., Palmer, C. T., Hoyenga, K., Hetsroni, A., & Kazmer, K., & (2008). Sex differences: Summarizing more than a century of scientific research. London: Routledge. 
Hetsroni, A. (Ed.). (2010). Reality television: Merging the global and the local. Hauppauge, NY: Nova Science Publishers. 
Hetsroni, A.. (2012). Advertising and reality: A global study of representation and content. NY: Continuum. 
Hetsroni, A. (Ed.). (2016). Television and romance – Studies, observations and interpretations. Hauppauge, NY: Nova Science Publishers. 
חצרוני, א' (2013). פיצוחים . ת"א: ידיעות ספרים. (Novel in Hebrew)

External links
Amir Hetsroni | Case Study Film Trailer on the director's channel on Youtube
Amir Hetsroni | Case Study Official Website
Professor Amir Hestroni Instagram account
Amir Hetsroni on Israel National News

References

1968 births
Living people
Israeli Jews
Israeli people of Romanian-Jewish descent
Tel Aviv University alumni
Academic staff of Koç University
Hebrew University of Jerusalem Faculty of Social Sciences alumni
Academic staff of Xi'an Jiaotong-Liverpool University
People from Tel Aviv
Israeli people of Polish-Jewish descent
Academic staff of Ariel University
Israeli expatriates in Turkey
Anti-Zionism in Israel
Male critics of feminism